Live (pronounced "liv") is the second live album by American comedian Tig Notaro. It is a deeply personal set performed just four days after Notaro was diagnosed with stage two breast cancer. The album was first released as a download on Louis C.K.'s website in 2012. It was the first release that C.K. featured on his website by a comedian other than himself, though it is no longer available on the website. The audio of the album was originally recorded at Notaro's regular monthly stand-up show Tig Has Friends at Largo for an episode of the radio show This American Life. Notaro did not want to put out the album at first, but C.K. convinced her to release it.

Deluxe edition
Secretly Canadian released the physical version of the album the next year on double-CD, download and a limited picture-disc vinyl as a Deluxe Edition. The Deluxe Edition bonus audio was originally recorded for The Moth radio show.

Track listing
Disc 1

Deluxe Edition - Disc 2

Personnel
 Album Cover Design – Daniel Murphy
 Design Concept, Design (Co-design) – Tig Notaro
 Photography By – Robyn Von Swank
 Recorded By – Alec Dixon

Awards
The album was nominated in 2014 for the Grammy Award for Best Comedy Album at the 56th Annual Grammy Awards, which Tig hosted the Pre-Telecast Ceremony streamed online.  Notaro lost to Kathy Griffin's Calm Down Gurrl.

Charts
The album peaked at No. 1 on Billboard's Top Comedy Albums chart.

References

Further reading

Tig Notaro albums
Live comedy albums
Live albums by American artists
2010s comedy albums
Stand-up comedy albums
2010s spoken word albums
Spoken word albums by American artists
2012 live albums
2013 live albums
Secretly Canadian live albums